Secrets of a Super Stud, also known as It's Getting Harder All the Time and Naughty Girls on the Loose, is a 1976 British sex comedy film, one of many to be also filmed in a hardcore version for export. It was shot at Twickenham Film Studios under the title "Custer’s Thirteen", the general release prints and the hardcore version were processed at Kay Labs at Highbury, North London.

Details of the film's hardcore version were leaked by the magazine Cinema X (July 1976; vol.8. no5, page 22), after the magazine had become disillusioned by certain British filmmakers refusal to acknowledge they were shooting hardcore "at Cinema X magazine we know which directors have shot porno; we’ve talked to their stars.  But its little use quoting them, when the directors, producers, above all their distributors, vociferously deny everything.  We prefer honesty in our pages."

Plot
Custer Firkinshaw (Anthony Kenyon) the owner of 'Bare Monthly' Magazine is up to his neck in dirty pictures and sexy secretaries.  His hedonistic ways are however temporary halted when his Uncle Charlie dies and Custer is pitted against his relatives. His Uncle leaves Custer a fortune in the will, but only on the condition that he marries and has a child within 12 months, otherwise it all goes to his relatives. Custer's money grabbing Aunt Sophie (Margaret Burton) knows only too well about Custer's swinging ways, so keep tabs on him by hiring a crooked private detective Bernie Selby (Alan Selwyn).  When Custer visits a doctor both parties discover that due to Custer's oversexed lifestyle he's only got 13 units of 'sexually activity' left, meaning he has only 13 more attempts to father a child.

When Aunt Sophie learns of this she plans to stitch Custer up calling on Selby to hire girls to seduce Custer and use up those potent 13 units of sexual activity.  Thereon in, it's a race against time as Custer tries to find a suitable bride to impregnate while Selby's girls pose as cat burglars, 'lost' neighbours and even drag up as meter inspectors in order to catch lure Custer into temptation.

Cast
Anthony Kenyon as Custer Firkinshaw
Mark Jones as Peter
Alan Selwyn as Bernie Selby
Margaret Burton as Aunt Sophie
Raymond Young as Uncle Clifton
Maggie Wright as Sybil
Jennifer Westbrook as Miranda
David Rayner as Dr. Lemmon
Michael Cronin as Dr. Halldenburger
Bobby Sparrow as Beryl
Juliet Groves as Julie
Daniella Fletcher as Miss Effingwell
Jeannette Charles as The Lady
Cosey Fanni Tutti as Gas Girl

Songs
Secrets of a Super Stud also contains several songs that relate the film's plot as if it were a western, using many double-entendres (‘Custer’s last stand’, ‘quick on the drawers’). The songs were written by Ross McManus, and performed by McManus and Laura Lee. They include:

 "It’s Getting Harder All the Time" (sung by McManus)
 "Custer Firkinshaw" (sung by McManus)
 "This is Your Last Stand" (sung by Lee)

References
Simon Sheridan, Keeping the British End Up: Four Decades of Saucy Cinema (2011) (fourth edition) Titan Books,

External links

British Video Cover
Alternative British Video Cover

1976 films
British sex comedy films
1970s English-language films
1970s sex comedy films
1976 comedy films
1970s British films